Pike, formerly Pike City is a census-designated place in Sierra County, California, United States. The community was named after Pike County, Missouri. The post office in Pike opened as Pike City Post Office in 1877, became Pike Post Office in 1895, and closed in 1954. The population was 134 at the 2010 census.

Pike is the home of playwright and director Zach Helm.

Geography
According to the United States Census Bureau, the CDP covers an area of 4.3 square miles (11.1 km), all of it land.

Demographics
The 2010 United States Census reported that Pike had a population of 134. The racial makeup of Pike was 130 (97.0%) White, 0 (0.0%) African American, 1 (0.7%) Native American, 2 (1.5%) Asian, 0 (0.0%) Pacific Islander, 0 (0.0%) from other races, and 1 (0.7%) from two or more races. Hispanic or Latino of any race were 2 persons (1.5%).

The Census reported that 134 people (100% of the population) lived in households, 0 (0%) lived in non-institutionalized group quarters, and 0 (0%) were institutionalized.

There were 66 households, out of which 13 (19.7%) had children under the age of 18 living in them, 30 (45.5%) were opposite-sex married couples living together, 5 (7.6%) had a female householder with no husband present, 4 (6.1%) had a male householder with no wife present.  There were 5 (7.6%) unmarried opposite-sex partnerships, and 1 (1.5%) same-sex married couples or partnerships. 20 households (30.3%) were made up of individuals, and 5 (7.6%) had someone living alone who was 65 years of age or older. The average household size was 2.03.  There were 39 families (59.1% of all households); the average family size was 2.54.

The population was spread out, with 16 people (11.9%) under the age of 18, 3 people (2.2%) aged 18 to 24, 25 people (18.7%) aged 25 to 44, 62 people (46.3%) aged 45 to 64, and 28 people (20.9%) who were 65 years of age or older.  The median age was 50.9 years. For every 100 females, there were 100.0 males.  For every 100 females age 18 and over, there were 87.3 males.

There were 90 housing units at an average density of 21.0 per square mile (8.1/km), of which 58 (87.9%) were owner-occupied, and 8 (12.1%) were occupied by renters. The homeowner vacancy rate was 0%; the rental vacancy rate was 0%.  117 people (87.3% of the population) lived in owner-occupied housing units and 17 people (12.7%) lived in rental housing units.

Politics

References

Census-designated places in Sierra County, California
Census-designated places in California
Populated places established in 1887
1887 establishments in California